Alexander Ivanovich Bedritsky (in Russian: Александр Иванович Бедрицкий) was the former president of the World Meteorological Organization, a position he had held from 2003 to 2011. In 2009 he was appointed as President Dmitry Medvedev's advisor on climate change.

In the past, he was the Director of the Russian Federal Service for Hydrometeorology and environmental monitoring – The Roshydromet (1993–2009). He was given the 2014 International Meteorological Organization Prize.

Since 25 January 2010 he is the special envoy of the President of Russia for climate affairs.

Honours and awards
Order For Merit to the Fatherland 4th class
Order of Courage
Medal "For Labour Valour"
Medal "Veteran of Labour"

References

External links
Berditsky on the Kremlin site

Living people
1st class Active State Councillors of the Russian Federation
World Meteorological Organization people
Medvedev Administration personnel
Russian officials of the United Nations
Year of birth missing (living people)